The Danakil mine is a mine located in the northern Afar Region of Ethiopia. It represents one of the largest potash reserves in the country, estimated at 3.03 billion tonnes of ore grading 18% potassium chloride metal.

See also
Dawa Okote mine
Gewane-Mille mine

References

Potash mines in Ethiopia